

Harald Gelhaus (24 July 1915 in Göttingen – 2 December 1997 in Bochum) was a German U-boat commander in World War II and recipient of the Knight's Cross of the Iron Cross of Nazi Germany.

Awards
 Wehrmacht Long Service Award 4th Class (5 April 1939)
 Iron Cross (1939)
 2nd Class (31 October 1940)
 1st Class (24 February 1941)
 U-boat War Badge (1939) (31 December 1940)
 U-boat Front Clasp in Bronze (1 October 1944)
 Knight's Cross of the Iron Cross on 26 March 1943 as Kapitänleutnant and commander of U-107
 War Merit Cross 2nd Class with Swords (1 September 1944)

References

Citations

Bibliography

External links

1915 births
1997 deaths
People from Göttingen
U-boat commanders (Kriegsmarine)
Recipients of the Knight's Cross of the Iron Cross
People from the Province of Hanover
Military personnel from Lower Saxony